The 7th Academy Awards, honoring the best in film for 1934, was held on February 27, 1935, at the Biltmore Hotel in Los Angeles, California. They were hosted by Irvin S. Cobb. As of this ceremony, the Academy's award eligibility period coincided with the calendar year (with temporary exceptions for the 93rd and 94th Academy Awards due to the COVID-19 pandemic).

Frank Capra's influential romantic comedy It Happened One Night became the first of three films to date to "sweep" the top five awards: Best Picture, Best Director, Best Actor, Best Actress, and Best Screenplay. This feat would later be matched by One Flew Over the Cuckoo's Nest in 1975 and The Silence of the Lambs in 1991. It also was the first romantic comedy to win Best Picture, and the first film to win two acting Oscars.

The categories of Best Film Editing, Best Original Score, and Best Original Song were first introduced this year. This was the first of only two years in which write-in candidates were permitted, a response to the controversy surrounding the snub of Bette Davis for Of Human Bondage.

This was the last time that all Best Actor nominees were first time acting nominees until the 95th Academy Awards, and the last time until the 43rd Academy Awards where either lead acting category was entirely first-time nominees.

Six-year-old Shirley Temple received the first Juvenile Award, making her the youngest Oscar recipient. Clark Gable was the first Best Actor winner born in the 20th century (1901).

Winners and nominees 

Nominees were announced on February 5, 1935. Winners are listed first and highlighted in boldface.

Academy Juvenile Award 

 Shirley Temple

Multiple nominations and awards 

The following eleven films received multiple nominations:

 6 nominations: One Night of Love
 5 nominations: Cleopatra, The Gay Divorcee and It Happened One Night
 4 nominations: The Affairs of Cellini, The Thin Man and Viva Villa!
 3 nominations: Imitation of Life
 2 nominations: The Barretts of Wimpole Street, Flirtation Walk and The White Parade

The following two films received multiple awards:

 5 awards: It Happened One Night
 2 awards: One Night of Love

See also 

 1934 in film
 List of Big Five Academy Award winners and nominees
 List of oldest and youngest Academy Award winners and nominees

References

Academy Awards ceremonies
1934 film awards
1935 in Los Angeles
1935 in American cinema
February 1935 events